is a railway station on the Sanyō Main Line in Itsukaichi-ekimae, Saeki-ku, Hiroshima, operated by West Japan Railway Company (JR West). The station connects to Hiroden-itsukaichi Station on the Hiroden Lines.

Platforms

Adjacent stations

|-
!colspan=5|JR West

Connecting bus routes

Hiroden Bus
From "Itsukaichi Station North-exit Bus Stop", there are Hiroden Bus routes.
"Higashi-kannon-dai - Itsukaichi Station North-exit"
"Fujinoki - Itsukaichi Station North-exit"
"Numata High-school - Itsukaichi Station North-exit"
"Ishiuchi By-pass via"
"Unten-menkyo Center - Ishiuchi By-pass via"
Ishiuchi old road via"
"Misuzu-gaoka High-school - Itsukaichi Station North-exit"
"Yamada-danchi - Itsukaichi Station North-exit"
From "Itsukaichi Station South-exit Bus Stop", there are Hiroden Bus routes.
"Higashi-kannon-dai - Itsukaichi Station South-exit"
"Fujinoki - Hatchobori Night Bus Route"
"Yuki - Itsukaichi Station South-exit"
"Yuki, Suginami-dai - Itsukaichi Station South-exit"

History
 Opened on December 8, 1899.

See also

 List of railway stations in Japan

External links

  

Railway stations in Hiroshima Prefecture
Railway stations in Japan opened in 1889
Sanyō Main Line
Hiroshima City Network
Stations of West Japan Railway Company in Hiroshima city